Middleville is the name of some places in Canada & the United States of America:

Middleville, Ontario
Middleville, Michigan
Middleville, New York
Middleville Township, Minnesota